The boubou or grand boubou is a flowing wide-sleeved robe worn across West Africa, and to a lesser extent in North Africa, related to the dashiki suit.

The garments and its variations are known by various names in different ethnic groups and languages. It is called agbádá in Yoruba, babban Riga in Hausa, boubou or mbubb in Wolof, k'sa or gandora in Tuareg, Kwayi Bèri in Zarma-Songhai, darra'a in  Maghrebi Arabic, grand boubou in various French-speaking West African countries and the English term gown.

The Senegalese boubou, a variation on the grand boubou described below, is also known as the Senegalese kaftan. The female version worn in some communities is also known as a m'boubou or kaftan.

History

Its origin lies with the clothing style of the Tuareg, Songhai-Zarma, Hausa, Kanuri, Toubou, and other trans-Saharan and Sahelian trading groups who used the robe as a practical means of protection from both elements (the harsh sun of the day and sub-freezing temperatures at night) while traversing the Sahara desert. The babban-riga/boubou was often paired with a large turban that covered the entire face, save for the eyes, known as Alasho in Hausa, Tagelmust in Tuareg, or Litham in Arabic. The nobility of 12th and 13th-century Mali, the 14th century Hausa Bakwai and Songhai Empires, then adopted this dress combination as a status symbol, as opposed to the traditional sleeveless or short-sleeved smocks (nowadays known as dashiki or Ghanaian smocks) worn by ordinary people/non-royals, or the Senegalese kaftan, a variant of the Arab thawb. The use of the boubou/babban-riga as clothing became widespread among West African Muslims with the migration of Hausa, Fulani and Dyula long-distance traders and Islamic preachers in and around Muslim regions of West Africa in the 1400s and even more rapidly in less Islamized areas after the Fulani Jihads of the 19th century and subsequent French and British colonization.

Use

Boubou is usually decorated with intricate embroidery, and is worn on special religious or ceremonial occasions, such as the two Islamic Eid festivals, weddings, funerals or for attending the Mosque for Friday prayer. It has become the formal attire of many countries in West Africa. Older robes have become family heirlooms passed on from father to son and are worn as status symbols.

There are female versions of the agbada style in Mali, Senegal, Gambia, Guinea, Niger, Mauritania and many other West African countries. An alternative female formal version of the boubou is also called the wrapper.

Clothing

Boubou as a full formal attire consists of three pieces of clothing: a pair of tie-up trousers that narrow towards the ankles (known as a ṣòkòtò pronounced "shokoto" in Yoruba), a long-sleeved shirt and a wide, open-stitched sleeveless gown worn over these. The three pieces are generally of the same colour. It is made from cotton and richly embroidered in traditional patterns. However, modern Yoruba make the Agbada from synthetic cloths that resemble silk in stark contrast to its cotton origins.

Method of wearing

There is a set etiquette to wearing the grand boubou, primarily in place to keep the over-gown above the ankles at any one time, in keeping with Islamic traditions of avoiding impurity (see Najis). This can include folding the open sleeves of the boubou over one's shoulders, normally done while walking or before sitting down, to ensure the over-gown does not rub against the ground, or by folding/wrapping each side over the other with the hand, narrowing the gown's space toward the ankles (as done by the Tuareg people). Thus, it is rare to see the grand boubou's square-shaped gown completely unwrapped.

Popularity

The use of the boubou was historically limited to various Islamised Sahelian and Saharan peoples of West Africa, but through increased trade and the spread of Islam throughout the region, it gained use among peoples in the savanna and forested regions of West Africa. Through this, the boubou was historically worn by chiefs of the Songhai of Niger and Mali, Hausa and Yoruba of Nigeria, Dagomba of Ghana, the Mandinka of the Gambia, the Susu of Guinea and the Temnes of Sierra Leone.

Today, Boubou has gained popularity as a fashionable form of attire among wide classes of people in West Africa, the African diaspora, and very recently, even among Bantu people in East, Southern and Central Africa.

Gender differences

Although usually a form of men's clothing, women's traditional clothing in much of Sahelian West Africa is of similar construction, though usually worn differently.  In some places these are called the m'boubou.  In other regions of West Africa, the female formal clothing has been a boubou variant, called a kaftan, and in other places it is the wrapper and headscarf.

See also
Aso Oke hat

References

Agbada. Adire African textiles.
Le Boubou—C'est Chic: Les boubous du Mali et d'autres pays de l'Afrique de l'Ouest - Book Review.  Kristyne Loughran. African Arts,  Summer 2002.
Ettagale Blauer. African Elegance. New York: Rizzoli, 1999.
Frances Kennett and Caroline MacDonald-Haig. Ethnic Dress. New York: Facts on File, 1994.

Islamic male clothing
Nigerian clothing
Robes and cloaks